ZWS may refer to:
 Zeus Web Server
 Zero-width space